Rowley Elliott (23 April 1877 – 17 December 1944) was a Unionist politician in Northern Ireland.

Family and early life 
Eldest of three sons of John R. Elliott, J.P, Coagh, his sisters were May Boyton Aiken and Agnes Witherow Bell. He was educated at Cookstown Academy and the Royal Belfast Academical Institution.  He married Annie Mary Berkeley and had one son; John Rowley Berkeley Elliott, and two daughters; Muriel and Miss A. Elliott. His niece was Florence Elliott, OBE.

Career 
After school he entered his father's business, Messrs. J. E. Elliott, Ltd., hardware merchants and grocers, as Postmaster Grocer and Hardware Merchant. Following this he went to become a farmer and breeder of Shorthorn cattle. At the same time he was a member of Tyrone County Council and served as its chairman. He was a justice of the peace and Deputy Lieutenant for County Tyrone. From 1925 to 1944 he was the Unionist Member of Parliament (MP) in the Northern Ireland parliament for Fermanagh and Tyrone and then South Tyrone. Elliott was also a member of the Orange Institution for many years, as well as the Masonic Order.

From 1941 to 1943 he served as Parliamentary Secretary to the Ministry of Labour under J. M. Andrews.

Sources

 http://www.election.demon.co.uk/stormont/biographies.html

1877 births
1944 deaths
Members of Tyrone County Council
Ulster Unionist Party members of the House of Commons of Northern Ireland
Members of the House of Commons of Northern Ireland 1925–1929
Members of the House of Commons of Northern Ireland 1929–1933
Members of the House of Commons of Northern Ireland 1933–1938
Members of the House of Commons of Northern Ireland 1938–1945
Northern Ireland junior government ministers (Parliament of Northern Ireland)
Members of the House of Commons of Northern Ireland for Fermanagh and Tyrone
Members of the House of Commons of Northern Ireland for County Tyrone constituencies